Villa d'Almè is a comune (municipality) in the Province of Bergamo in the Italian region of Lombardy, located about  northeast of Milan and about  northwest of Bergamo.  
 
Villa d'Almè borders the following municipalities: Almè, Almenno San Salvatore, Sedrina, Sorisole, Ubiale Clanezzo. Part of Villa d'Almè's territory is included in the  Parco dei Colli di Bergamo.

References

External links
 Official website